Zenillia is a genus of flies in the family Tachinidae.

Species
Z. dolosa (Meigen, 1824)
Z. libatrix (Panzer, 1798)
Z. phrynoides (Baranov, 1939)
Z. terrosa Mesnil, 1953

References

Exoristinae
Diptera of Europe
Diptera of Asia
Tachinidae genera
Taxa named by Jean-Baptiste Robineau-Desvoidy